The Battle of Cape Celidonia took place on 14 July 1616 during the Ottoman-Habsburg struggle for the control of the Mediterranean when a small Spanish fleet under the command of Francisco de Rivera y Medina cruising off Cyprus was attacked by an Ottoman fleet that vastly outnumbered it. Despite this, the Spanish ships, mostly galleons, managed to repel the Ottomans, whose fleet consisted mainly of galleys, inflicting heavy losses.

Background 

In mid-1616 a Spanish fleet under the command of Captain Don Francisco de Rivera y Medina sailed from the Spanish Kingdom of Sicily to Eastern Mediterranean waters in order to undertake privateering against Ottoman vessels and ports in the area between Cyprus and the region of Çukurova. It was composed of 5 galleons and a patache. These ships were the 52-gun Concepción, flagship of Rivera; the 34-gun Almirante, commanded by alférez Serrano; the 27-gun Buenaventura, under Don Ínigo de Urquiza; the 34-gun Carretina, commanded by Balmaseda; the 30-gun San Juan Bautista, commanded by Juan Cereceda; and the 14-gun patache Santiago under Gazarra. Aboard the ships were about 1,600 Spanish soldiers, of whom 1,000 were musketeers.

The Spanish fleet sailed to the island of Cyprus, then under Ottoman rule, where Francisco de Rivera ordered that land be sighted prior to initiating of the cruise. During the mission 16 merchant caramoussals were captured by Rivera's fleet off Cape Celidonia, as well as an English privateer in Famagusta and a large number of minor vessels at sea. In addition, ten warships were sunk or burnt in the port of Salinas, whose defenses were also destroyed by a landing party which suffered no loss. The Ottoman governor of Cyprus, who had been rapidly informed regarding the Spanish activities, called for help from the Ottoman navy. Rivera, warned of the relief force thanks to the capture of a merchant vessel coming from Constantinople, decided to wait for his pursuers off Cape Celidonia in order to return to Sicily with a great victory. A Turkish fleet of 55 galleys with about 275 guns and 12,000 fighting men on board appeared off the cape few days later, on 14 July.

Battle 
The battle began at 9 am when the Ottoman galleys moved toward the Spanish ships and opened fire. Previously they had formed up into a huge crescent, designed to encircle the Spanish ships. To avoid his ships becoming separated and overwhelmed individually in the light wind conditions, de Rivera ordered his ships join each other end to end with chains. The Concepción stood at the vanguard, being followed by the Carretina, the Almiranta, and the patache Santiago. The other two ships remained on standby. Their heavy artillery fire kept the Turkish vessels at bay until sunset. The attackers then withdrew to their initial positions with eight galleys about to sink and many others damaged.

The attack was resumed the next morning, when, after a night war council, the Ottomans attacked in two groups which separately attempted to capture the Capitana (or flagship) and the Almiranta (or secondary ship). After approaching inside the range of the Spanish muskets, the galleys were subjected to the heavy gunfire of the entire Spanish flotilla. Unable to board the Spanish ships, the Ottoman force withdrew in the evening with another 10 galleys heeling over.

That night a new council of war took place during which the Turks decided to resume the action at dawn. After a speech that boosted their morale, the Ottomans attacked with great resolve and managed to approach Rivera's flagship from a more favorable angle in order to exploit her blind spot. Nevertheless, the Spanish commander, who had foreseen such a possibility, ordered that the Santiago move to his ship's bow. This maneuver exposed the Turkish galleys to more heavy gunfire which inflicted severe damage, finally forcing the Ottoman force to withdraw at 3:00 pm with another galley sunk, two dismasted, and 17 others severely damaged or heeling over.

Aftermath 
The Turkish fleet suffered heavy losses, with 10 galleys sunk and another 23 disabled. 1,200 Janissaries and 2,000 sailors and rowers were killed. The Spanish suffered 34 dead and 93 wounded as well as damage to the rigging of the Concepción and the Santiago, which had to be towed by the other ships. For his success Rivera was promoted to Admiral by King Philip III, who also rewarded him with the habit of the Order of Santiago. The soldiers and sailors of the fleet were also recognized by the Duke of Osuna. Some time later the Spanish playwright and poet Don Luís Vélez de Guevara wrote the comedy "El asombro de Turquía y valiente toledano" ("the wonder of Turkey and the courageous Toledoan") to commemorate the battle.

Notes

References

Cape Celidonia
Cape Celidonia
Cape Celidonia
Cape Celidonia
1616 in the Ottoman Empire